The 2016 version of the Syrian Cup is the 46th edition to be played. It is the premier knockout tournament for football teams in Syria. Al-Wahda are the defending champions.

The competition has been disrupted because of the ongoing Syrian Civil War, where some games have been awarded as 3:0 victories due to teams not being able to compete.

The winners of the competition will enter the 2017 AFC Cup qualifying playoffs.

First round

Second round

Third round

Quarter finals

Semi finals

Final

References

2016
2016 domestic association football cups
Cup